Jamiltepec District is located in the west of the Costa Region of the State of Oaxaca, Mexico.

Municipalities

The district includes the following municipalities:
 
Mártires de Tacubaya
Pinotepa de Don Luis
Pinotepa Nacional
San Agustín Chayuco
San Andrés Huaxpaltepec
San Antonio Tepetlapa
San José Estancia Grande
San Juan Bautista lo de Soto
San Juan Cacahuatepec
San Juan Colorado
San Lorenzo, Oaxaca
San Miguel Tlacamama
San Pedro Atoyac
San Pedro Jicayán
San Sebastián Ixcapa
Santa Catarina Mechoacán
Santa María Cortijo
Santa María Huazolotitlán
Santiago Ixtayutla
Santiago Jamiltepec
Santiago Llano Grande
Santiago Tapextla
Santiago Tetepec
Santo Domingo Armenta

References

Districts of Oaxaca
Costa Region